Arabella is a female given name, possibly of Greek, Latin, or Celtic origin.

Origin and history

The earliest known use of the name in settlements was the modern-day northern Jordanian city of Irbid, known in ancient times as Arabella or Arbela (Άρβηλα in Ancient Greek). With regards to personal names, the first attested usage of the name was Arabella de Leuchars (c.1135–1203), a granddaughter of the Scottish king William the Lion. The earliest English use was the granddaughter of Arabella de Leuchars, Arabella de Quincy (c.1186–1258), the daughter of Saer de Quincy, 1st Earl of Winchester.

Typical for medieval bearers of the name, both these Arabellas are also documented as Orabel[la] and Orabilia, and in documents that Latinize names as Orabilis. A Latin construction which suffixes orare with ābilis  interprets the name's meaning as "given to prayer" or "entreatable". Orabilis has been suggested as the root of the name Arabella and its variants.

However, Orabilis may have been a purely speculative Latinized form, rather than Arabella's true root. Its usage, long being confined to Great Britain with no equivalent names in evident use elsewhere, would argue for a British origin, such as the Celtic òr a bheul "golden mouth", or the Scottish equivalent of  Bel-óir, the Irish epithet for Saint Gregory the Great.

Another theory suggests that the name Arabella, like the name Annabel, is a Scottish development of Amabel, whose ultimate root is the Latin amabilis (lovable), with the name passing to Great Britain via France.

The first high-profile English bearer of the name was royal claimant Arabella Stuart (1575-1615), also referred to as Arbella, a great-granddaughter of Margaret Tudor. The name Arabella remained rare in England until the Restoration ushered in a fashion for ornate names.

Arabella Fermor (1696–1737) was a celebrated London beauty, whose highest profile evocation was as the heroine of Alexander Pope's 1712 poem The Rape of the Lock, under the name "Belinda". Pope introduced the 1717 edition of this poem with a dedication of "To Mrs Arabella Fermor".

Arabella remained fairly popular in Georgian and Victorian Britain. It began to decline in use in the late 1800s, and reached a nadir in the 1940s, when there were only 15 recorded births with that name. The name has seen a steady resurgence since the 1990s, reaching #95 in England and Wales in 2015.

Despite the potential for being valued as a "heritage name", as it was the name of the flagship of the Winthrop Fleet (see Arbella), Arabella was not as popular in the United States. A rare high-profile American bearer of the name was Arabella Mansfield (née Babb) (1846–1911), the first female to pass a United States bar examination: Mansfield's birth name was Belle Aurelia Babb, but she began using Arabella as her first name in her first year of law school in 1862.

Arabella ranked in the Top 1000 most given names for American newborn girls in the 1880s, with a  median ranking from that decade's respective yearly tallies being #969. Arabella then became progressively rarer in the United States, until a Top 1000 re-entry on the tally of the most given names for American newborn girls for the year 2006, which ranked it at #653: The name has continued to gain favor, ranking on the tally of the most given names for American newborn girls for the year 2014 at #174.

People named Arabella
 Arabella Arbenz (1940–1965), Guatemalan model and actor
 Arabella Buckley (1840–1929), English writer and science educator
 Arabella Bushnell, Canadian actress
 Arabella Campbell (born 1973), Canadian artist
 Arabella Castro Quiñónez (born 1955), Guatemalan politician
 Arabella Chapman (1859–1927), American maker of photo albums
 Arabella Churchill (charity founder) (born 1949), English charity founder, festival organiser, and fundraiser
 Arabella Churchill (royal mistress) (1648–1730), mistress of King James II
 Arabella Denny (1707–1792), Irish philanthropist
 Arabella Dorman (born 1975), British painter
 Arabella Edge, Australian novelist
 Arabella Fermor (1696–1737), model for the character Belinda in the poem The Rape of the Lock
 Arabella Field (born 1965), American actor 
 Arabella Fields (1879–1931), American singer
 Arabella Goddard (1836–1922), English pianist
 Arabella Holzbog (born 1966), British-American actress
 Arabella Hunt (1662–1705), English vocalist and lutenist 
 Arabella Huntington (circa 1850–1924), American philanthropist
 Arabella Jeffereyes (died 1810), Irish philanthropist
 Arabella Johnson (1597–1630), early American settler
 Arabella Kenealy (1859–1938), British writer and physician
 Arabella Kiesbauer (born 1969), German-Austrian TV presenter, writer and actor
 Arabella Lawrence (1787–1873), English educator
 Arabella Lennox-Boyd (born 1938), Italian-born English garden designer
 Arabella Mansfield (1846–1911), first female lawyer in the United States
 Arabella McKenzie (born 1999), Australian rugby union player
 Arabella Menage (1782–1817), British actress and ballet dancer
 Arabella Moreton (died 1727), British poet
 Arabella Morton (born 2000), Australian actress
 Arabella Ng (born 2001), Hong Kong alpine skier
 Arabella Plantin (1700–?), British novelist
 Arabella Pollen (born 1961), English fashion designer and author
 Arabella Rankin (1871–1943), Scottish painter
 Arabella Elizabeth Roupell (1817–1914), English painter
 Arabella Scott (1886–1980), Scottish suffragette
 Arabella Smith, Turks and Caicos Islands politician
 Arabella Steinbacher (born 1981), German violinist
 Arabella Sullivan (1796–1839), British writer
 Lady Arbella Stuart (1575–1615), also spelled Arabella, considered a possible successor to Queen Elizabeth I of England
 Arabella Valpy (1833–1910), New Zealand pioneer
 Arabella Weir (born 1957), Scottish comedian, actress and writer

Fictional characters named Arabella

 Arabella, heroine of The Female Quixote (1752) by Charlotte Lennox
 Arabella, character in the comic opera of the same name with music by Richard Strauss and a German libretto by Hugo von Hofmannsthal. Premiered in 1933.
 Arabella Allen, Mr. Winkle's love interest in Charles Dickens' novel, The Pickwick Papers.
 Arabella Bishop, heroine of the 1922 novel Captain Blood by Rafael Sabatini
 the above as portrayed in the films Captain Blood (1924) and Captain Blood (1935) by respectively Jean Paige and Olivia de Havilland
 Arabella Babe Carey, character in the ABC-TV soap opera All My Children, introduced in 2003 by Alexa Havins
 Arabella Donn, wife of the title character in the novel Jude the Obscure (1895) by Thomas Hardy
 Lady Arabella Gresham, major character in the 1858 novel Doctor Thorne by Anthony Trollope
 the above as portrayed by Rebecca Front in the 2016 ITV series Doctor Thorne
 Arabella Rittenhouse, ingenue role portrayed by Lillian Roth in the Marx Brothers' Animal Crackers (1930)
 Arabella Strange, wife of title character Jonathan Strange in Jonathan Strange and Mr Norrell  (2004) by Susanna Clarke
 Arabella Tallant, heroine of the 1949 novel Arabella by Georgette Heyer
 Arabella Trefoil, anti-heroine in The American Senator (1875) by Anthony Trollope
 Arabella Wilmot, bride to George Primrose in The Vicar of Wakefield (1766) by Oliver Goldsmith
 Arabella Figg, a squib, member of the Order of the Phoenix, in the "Harry Potter" books
 Arabella, Niece of Ariel "Rise of Isle of the Lost"
 Princess Arabella: In "The Dragon and a Rat Tale" by Donnabelle Pineda and Rudy L., fairytale story (2018) books.
Queen Arabella Skydancer: A supporting character of The Unicorn Chronicles book series in which she was the long-lived Queen of the Unicorns for many centuries until her long-lost granddaughter was found, as the elderly human woman Ivy Morris, and restored to her true unicorn form and name of Amalia Flickerfoot
Arabella Baylor: main character of the Hidden Legacy series by American writing duo Ilona Andrews
Arabella, character from Shimmer and Shine

See also

Arabella (disambiguation)

References

Feminine given names
English feminine given names
Scottish feminine given names